A Man About the House is a 1942 novel by the British writer Francis Brett Young. Two sisters living a life of genteel poverty in North Bromwich discover that they have inherited a villa near Capri from an uncle. In the warmth of the Italian climate they both flourish, but the presence of the villa's handyman provides a troubling note.

Adaptations
In 1946 Flora Robson and Basil Sydney appeared in a stage adaptation A Man About the House by John Perry at the Piccadilly Theatre in the West End.

In 1947 it was made into a British film of the same title directed by Leslie Arliss and starring Dulcie Gray, Margaret Johnston and Kieron Moore.

References

Bibliography
 Hall, Michael. Francis Brett Young. Seren, 1997.
 Goble, Alan. The Complete Index to Literary Sources in Film. Walter de Gruyter, 1999.
 Wearing, J.P. The London Stage 1940-1949: A Calendar of Productions, Performers, and Personnel.  Rowman & Littlefield, 2014.

1942 British novels
Novels by Francis Brett Young
British novels adapted into films
British novels adapted into plays
Novels set in England
Novels set in Italy
Heinemann (publisher) books